The women's  57 kg competition of the taekwondo events at the 2015 Pan American Games took place on July 20 at the Mississauga Sports Centre. The defending Pan American Games champion was Irma Contreras of the Mexico.

Qualification

Most athletes qualified through the qualification tournament held in March 2015 in Mexico, while host nation Canada was permitted to enter one athlete. Two athletes from El Salvador and Uruguay later received wildcards to compete in this event.

Schedule
All times are Eastern Daylight Time (UTC-4).

Results

Main bracket
The final results were:

Repechage

References

Taekwondo at the 2015 Pan American Games
Pan